William Lee (August 21, 1916 – November 15, 1980) was an American playback singer who provided a voice or singing voice in many films, for actors in musicals and for many Disney characters.

Biography
Lee was born on August 21, 1916, in Johnson, Nebraska, and grew up in Des Moines, Iowa.  His initial musical focus was as a trombone player, but after singing in several college vocal groups, he decided to concentrate on his voice.  He served as an ensign in the United States Navy during World War II, then moved to Hollywood upon discharge.  The bulk of Lee's income consisted of singing commercials for radio and television, much of which Lee felt was "silly" but he appreciated the financial independence this work gave him.  He sang the lead role in a 1953 Gordon Jenkins made-for-record musical entitled Seven Dreams.

Much of Lee's best-known work is as part of the popular singing quartet known as The Mellomen, founded by Thurl Ravenscroft.  It was Lee, rather than Ravenscroft, who provided Shere Khan's sung line during "That's What Friends Are For" in The Jungle Book. Richard M. Sherman confirmed this fact on the audio commentary on its 2007 DVD release. Though George Sanders, Shere Khan's voice actor, was an accomplished singer, he was not available during the finalized recording of the song.

Lee performed prolifically for The Walt Disney Company.  Initially his Disney efforts were as part of The Mellomen, but he was later given many solos on Disneyland Records.  For the million-selling second-cast Disneyland album of Mary Poppins, Lee performs as Bert and Mr. Banks.  In the film itself, Lee sang as one of the barnyard menagerie in "Jolly Holiday".  He has appeared as Goofy in the 1965 LP Children's Riddles and Game Songs.  At the Disney theme parks, he is the voice of Melvin the moose in Country Bear Jamboree. Lee also sang the Bat Masterson theme song from the popular television series.

Lee also provided the singing voice for Christopher Plummer in The Sound of Music and for John Kerr in South Pacific.
 
Lee died of a brain tumor on November 15, 1980, in Los Angeles, California.

Partial filmography

Words and Music (1948) - singing voice for Tom Drake
Alice in Wonderland (1951) - Card Painter, a member of The Mellomen
Peter Pan (1953) - Pirates (singing voice)
Seven Brides for Seven Brothers (1954) - Caleb Pontipee (singing voice)
Lady and the Tramp (1955) - Dog, as a member of The Mellomen
Zorro (1957-1959) - Diego de la Vega (singing voice)
South Pacific (1958) - Lieutenant Joseph Cable (singing voice)
One Hundred and One Dalmatians (1961) - Roger (singing voice)
Snow White and the Three Stooges (1961) - Quatro/Prince Charming (singing voice)
The Alvin Show (1961-1962) - Additional voices
Gay Purr-ee (1962) - Hench Cat (singing voice)
Hey There, It's Yogi Bear! (1964) - Yogi Bear (singing voice)
Mary Poppins (1964) - Ram (singing voice)
Cinderella (1965) - Father
Tom and Jerry (1965–1972) - (singing voice)
The Sound of Music (1965) - Captain von Trapp (singing voice)
The Jungle Book (1967) - Singing elephant, Shere Khan (singing voice)
Thoroughly Modern Millie (1967) - Trevor Graydon (singing voice)
Winnie the Pooh and the Blustery Day (1968) - Honeypot Quartet, as a member of The Mellomen
Horton Hears a Who! (1970) - Wickersham Brother (singing voice)
Charlotte's Web (1973) - Singer
The Hobbit (1977) - Goblin (singing voice)

(Sang the Bat Masterson Theme song)

References

External links

1916 births
1980 deaths
20th-century American male singers
20th-century American singers
Deaths from brain cancer in the United States
People from Nemaha County, Nebraska
Singers from Nebraska
Disney people